Bibasis aquilina is a Palearctic  butterfly in the family Hesperiidae and the subfamily Coeliadinae. It is found in China, Amur and Japan.

The larva feeds on  Kalopanax septemlobus.

Subspecies
B. a. aquilina
B. a. chrysaeglia (Butler, [1882]) (Japan)
B. a. siola Evans, 1934 (China)

References

Butterflies described in 1879
Bibasis
Butterflies of Asia